Imendyashevo (İmändäş) is a rural locality (a selo) in Imendyashevsky Selsoviet, Gafuriysky District, Bashkortostan, Russia. The population was 341 as of 2010. There are 6 streets.

Geography 
Imendyashevo is located 53 km northeast of Krasnousolsky (the district's administrative centre) by road. Taishevo is the nearest rural locality.

References 

Rural localities in Gafuriysky District